Nicolas Frémery (? - after 1687) was a French 17th-century sculptor, best known for his marble copies of the Medici Venus, the Apollino and other works by classical and Hellenistic sculptors.  He also produced a Faustina and a Urania for the gardens of the Palace of Versailles.

References

17th-century French sculptors
French male sculptors
1687 deaths
Year of birth unknown